Incorporation may refer to:
 Incorporation (business), the creation of a corporation
 Incorporation of a place, creation of municipal corporation such as a city or county
 Incorporation (academic), awarding a degree based on the student having an equivalent degree from another university
 Incorporation of the Bill of Rights, extension of parts of the United States Bill of Rights to bind individual American states.
 Incorporation of international law, giving domestic legal force to a sovereign state's international legal obligations 
 Incorporation (linguistics)
 Incorporation (Netherlands), the annexation of the Netherlands by the First French Empire

See also 
 Incorporation by reference
 Incorporated (disambiguation) 
 Corporation
 Possession